bTV Comedy is a Bulgarian family-based television channel, airing mostly comedy series. It is part of bTV Media Group, owned by Central European Media Enterprises, a subsidiary of AT&T/WarnerMedia. Originally launched in 1997 as Television Triada - a news channel airing CNN English language news, it replaced TV5 Monde terrestrial in Sofia. It was owned by Krassimir Guergov and Triada Communications. On September 30, 2005, it was re-branded as GTV (sometimes promoted as "The Good Television" and Guergov TV) and began airing comedy series and films. The current name of the channel, bTV, was put in place on October 1, 2009, when bTV took over the channel.

External links
 Main idents

Television networks in Bulgaria
Bulgarian-language television stations
Television channels and stations established in 2005